was a  after Meiwa and before Tenmei. This period spanned the years November 1772 through  March 1781.

Change of era
 1772 : The era name was changed to An'ei (meaning "peaceful eternity") to mark the enthronement of Emperor Go-Momozono and in hopes of turning attention from the serial catastrophic devastation from fires and storms in Meiwa 9. The previous era ended and a new one commenced in the 11th month of Meiwa 9.

Events of the An'ei era
 1775 (An'ei 4): Epidemic diseases spread across the country – in Edo alone, an estimated 190,000 perished.
 1775 (An'ei 4): Swedish physician and botanist Carl Peter Thunberg arrives at VOC outpost or "factory" in Nagasaki bay; and ultimately, his scientific activities will result in the first detailed, descriptive survey of the flora and fauna of the Japanese archipelago.
 1778 (An'ei 7): Kyoto suffers a massive flood.
 1778 (An'ei 7): Volcanic island of Sakurajima erupts one mile away from Kagoshima – 16,000 dead.
 1779 (An'ei 8): Dutch surgeon and cultural-anthropologist Isaac Titsingh arrives at Dejima for the first of three terms as Opperhoofd or captain of the VOC station; and ultimately, his seminal research will become a noteworthy step in that process in which the Japanese begin to describe and characterize themselves in their own terms. Titsingh's correspondence with William Marsden, a philologist colleague in the Royal Society in London, provides some insight into his personal appreciation of the task at hand. In an 1809 letter, he explains:

Bakufu policy in this era was designed to marginalize the influence of foreigners in An'ei Japan; however, an unintended and opposite consequence of sakoku was to enhance the value and significance of a very small number of thoughtful observers like Thunberg and Titsingh, whose writings document what each scholar learned or discovered first-hand. Thunberg's and Titsingh's published accounts and their unpublished writings provided a unique and useful perspective for Orientalists and Japanologists in the 19th century; and the work of both men continues to be rigorously examined by modern researchers today.
 1780 (An'ei 9): Heavy rains and floods in the Kantō necessitate extensive government relief in the flood-stricken areas.

Notes

See also
 Bunsei – Philipp Franz von Siebold
 Genroku – Engelbert Kaempfer

References
 Hall, John Whitney. (1955). Tanuma Okitsugu, 1719-1788: Forerunner of Modern Japan. Cambridge: Harvard University Press.  OCLC  445621
 Lequin, Frank, ed. (1990). Private Correspondence of Isaac Titsingh. Amsterdam: J.C. Gieben. 
 Nussbaum, Louis-Frédéric and Käthe Roth. (2005). Japan Encyclopedia. Cambridge: Harvard University Press. ; OCLC 48943301
 Screech, Timon. (2006). Secret Memoirs of the Shoguns: Isaac Titsingh and Japan, 1779-1822. London: RoutledgeCurzon. ; OCLC 65177072
 Thunberg, Carl Peter. (1804), Flora Japonica. Upsala.
 . (1796). Voyages de C.P. Thunberg au Japon par le Cap de Bonne-Espérance, les Isles de la Sonde, etc. ("Voyages of C.P. Thunberg to Japan, along the Cape of Good Hope, the Islands of Sunda etc"). Paris. ... Click link for digitized copy of pertinent sections of Thunberg's work which was reprinted in Richard Hildreth's "Japan as It Was and Is" (1855, pp. 387-423)
 Titsingh, Isaac. (1834). Nihon Odai Ichiran; ou,  Annales des empereurs du Japon.  Paris: Royal Asiatic Society, Oriental Translation Fund of Great Britain and Ireland. OCLC 5850691.

External links
 National Diet Library, "The Japanese Calendar" – historical overview plus illustrative images from library's collection
 National Archives of Japan:  Hinozenshu sanbutsu zuko, scroll showing illustrated inventory of industries in Hizen, An'ei 2 (1773)

Japanese eras
1770s in Japan
1780s in Japan